Cabestana cutacea, common name the Mediterranean bark triton, is a species of predatory sea snail, a marine gastropod mollusk in the family Cymatiidae.

Description
The adult shell size varies between 25 mm and 90 mm.

Distribution
This species is found in European waters (Spain); in the Atlantic Ocean off the Canary Islands, the Azores and the Cape Verdes;  and off Mozambique and South Africa.

List of synonyms

 Aquillus cutaceus (Linnaeus, 1767)
 Aquillus cutaceus var. major Pallary, 1920 
 Aquillus dolarium (Linnaeus, 1767)
 Aquillus dolarium attenuata (f) Pallary, P., 1920
 Aquillus dolarium elongata (f) Pallary, P., 1920
 Aquillus dolarium major (f) Pallary, P., 1920
 Cabestana costata Röding, 1798
 Cabestana cutacea cutacea (Linnaeus, 1767)
 Cabestana dolaria (Linnaeus, 1767)
 Cabestana doliata Röding, 1798
 Cymatium doliarium Linnaeus 1767
 Murex cutaceus Linnaeus, 1767
 Murex dolarium Linnaeus, 1767
 Murex succinctus Risso, 1826
 Ranella lemania Risso, 1826
 Ranella tuberculata Risso, 1826
 Simpulum dolarium (Linnaeus, 1767)
 Simpulum dolarium var. elongata Pallary, 1903 
 Triton africanum Adams A., 1855
 Triton cutaceum (Linnaeus, 1767) (incorrect gender agreement of specific epithet)
 Triton cutaceus (Linnaeus, 1767)
 Triton cutaceus var. curta Buquoy, Dautzenberg & Dollfus, 1882
 Triton cutaceus var. gerna de Gregorio, 1885
 Triton cutaceus var. isgura de Gregorio, 1885
 Tritonium curtum Locard, 1886
 Tritonium danieli Locard, 1886

References

 MacNae, W. & M. Kalk (eds) (1958). A natural history of Inhaca Island, Mozambique. Witwatersrand Univ. Press, Johannesburg. I-iv, 163 pp
 Gofas, S.; Le Renard, J.; Bouchet, P. (2001). Mollusca, in: Costello, M.J. et al. (Ed.) (2001). European register of marine species: a check-list of the marine species in Europe and a bibliography of guides to their identification. Collection Patrimoines Naturels, 50: pp. 180–213

External links
 

Cymatiidae
Gastropods described in 1767
Taxa named by Carl Linnaeus
Molluscs of the Atlantic Ocean
Molluscs of the Indian Ocean
Molluscs of the Mediterranean Sea
Molluscs of the Azores
Molluscs of the Canary Islands
Gastropods of Cape Verde
Invertebrates of Mozambique
Invertebrates of South Africa
Molluscs of Europe